Stamatov is a Bulgarian surname, derived from the male given name Stamat, itself derived from Greek name Stamatis meaning "stopper" (stamata means "to stop"). It may refer to:

Georgi Stamatov (1893–1965), Bulgarian actor and director.
Georgi Porfiriev Stamatov (1869–1942), Bulgarian writer.
Varban Stamatov (1924–1998), Bulgarian writer, marine novelist, publicist and editor.

See also
Stamatopoulos, Greek surname
Stamatović, Serbian surname

Bulgarian-language surnames